Tim Wedderburn (born June 29, 1981) is a Canadian former professional ice hockey defenceman.

Playing career
Wedderburn played major junior hockey with the Prince George Cougars of the Western Hockey League, then went on to play 10 seasons of professional hockey in North America and Europe. He played his final two seasons as an assistant captain with the Braehead Clan of the United Kingdom's Elite Ice Hockey League before hanging up his skates following the 2011–12 EIHL season.

Career statistics

References

External links

1981 births
Living people
Braehead Clan players
Canadian ice hockey defencemen
Chicago Wolves players
Hershey Bears players
Lake Erie Monsters players
Mohawk Valley Comets players
Prince George Cougars players
Rockford IceHogs (UHL) players
San Diego Gulls (WCHL) players
SG Cortina players
Utah Grizzlies (AHL) players
Victoria Salmon Kings players
Canadian expatriate ice hockey players in the United States
Canadian expatriate ice hockey players in Scotland
Canadian expatriate ice hockey players in Italy